The 1980 BC Lions finished in fourth place in the Western Conference with an 8–7–1 record. Despite the winning record, they still failed to make the playoffs.

Joe Paopao took over as the starting quarterback, due to Jerry Tagge's career ending knee injury.  Due to injuries to Paopao, rookie Roy Dewalt also got six starts at pivot.

With Larry Key missing half the season, John Henry White was the Lions main offensive threat with 834 rushing yards and 283 receiving yards.  Harry Holt had a great season at tight end with 648 yards receiving and 6 touchdowns. 

Centre  Al Wilson (for 6th consecutive year) and Harry Holt were named to the CFL All-star team.

Offseason

CFL Draft

Preseason

Regular season

Season standings

Season schedule

Offensive leaders

Awards and records

1980 CFL All-Stars
C – Al Wilson, CFL All-Star

1980 CFL Western All-Stars
TE – Harry Holt, CFL Western All-Star
C – Al Wilson, CFL Western All-Star

References

BC Lions seasons
1980 Canadian Football League season by team
1980 in British Columbia